Donald Joseph Oliver (29 April 1909 – 25 June 1990) was an All Blacks rugby union player from New Zealand.  He was a wing threequarter.

He played three matches including two tests for the All Blacks, scoring 6 points and two tries for New Zealand against the British Lions in 1930. 
 
He played for several provincial sides; Otago, Wellington, Wairarapa, Waikato, and Southland. He was a selector for Horowhenua 1948-50 and Manawatu-Horowhenua 1949–50.

He was born in Dunedin and died in Hastings.

References

Bibliography
Palenski, R., Chester, R., and McMillan, N., (2005). The Encyclopaedia of New Zealand Rugby (4th ed.).  Auckland: Hodder Moa Beckett. 

1909 births
1990 deaths
New Zealand rugby union players
New Zealand international rugby union players
Rugby union wings
Rugby union players from Dunedin